Schistura bannaensis is a species of freshwater fish in the family Nemacheilidae. It is endemic to the Nanla River basin, a part of the upper Mekong basin in Yunnan, China. It grows to  standard length.

References

bannaensis
Fish described in 2005
Fish of the Mekong Basin
Freshwater fish of China
Endemic fauna of Yunnan